15 auténticos éxitos (15 Authentic Hits) is a greatest hits album by Mexican singer Irma Serrano, released in 1984 by CBS Records International. It features Serrano's fifteen hit songs released from 1963 to 1967.

Track listing

References

External links
 15 auténticos éxitos at AllMusic

1984 greatest hits albums
Spanish-language compilation albums
Columbia Records compilation albums